The Midland Subdivision is a railroad owned by CSX Transportation and operated by Indiana and Ohio Railway in the U.S. State of Ohio. The line runs from St. Bernard, Ohio to Columbus, Ohio for a total of 107.0 miles. At its west end the line connects to the Norfolk Southern Cincinnati Line (the westernmost part of the Dayton District), and at its east end the line connects with the Dayton District near its easternmost point.

See also
 List of CSX Transportation lines

References

Ohio railroads
Genesee & Wyoming